Mallotus peltatus is a species of flowering plant in the family Euphorbiaceae, native from India to Papuasia. It was first described by Eduard Ferdinand Geiseler in 1807 as Aleurites peltatus.

Distribution
Mallotus peltatus is native to southeast China, Hainan, the Indian region, the Andaman Islands, Cambodia, Myanmar, the Nicobar Islands, Thailand, Vietnam, Malesia (Borneo, Java, the Lesser Sunda Islands, Peninsular Malaysia, the Maluku Islands, the Philippines, Sulawesi and Sumatra), the Bismarck Archipelago and New Guinea.

Conservation
Mallotus odoratus was assessed as "vulnerable" in the 1998 IUCN Red List, where it is said to be native only to a single island in the Philippines. , this species was regarded included within Mallotus peltatus, which has a very much wider distribution.

References

peltatus
Flora of the Bismarck Archipelago
Flora of Southeast China
Flora of Hainan
Flora of India (region)
Flora of the Andaman Islands
Flora of Cambodia
Flora of Malesia
Flora of Myanmar
Flora of New Guinea
Flora of the Nicobar Islands
Flora of Thailand
Flora of Vietnam
Plants described in 1807